Charles Atherton Brown (8 June 1854 – 8 July 1917) was an Australian-born English cricketer. Brown was a right-handed batsman who bowled left-arm roundarm fast.

Brown was born at Sydney, New South Wales. He made his first-class debut for Sussex against Kent in 1876 at the County Ground, Hove. He made ten further first-class appearances for the county, the last of which came against Kent 1876 at the Higher Common Ground, Tunbridge Wells. In his eleven first-class matches for Sussex, he took 25 wickets at an average of 23.00, with best figures of 7/58. These figures, which were one of two five-wicket hauls he took, came against Gloucestershire in 1877. With the bat, he scored 137 runs at a batting average of 9.13, with a high score of 26.

Brown died at the now demolished Grendon Hall in Grendon, Warwickshire, on 8 July 1917.

References

External links
Charles Brown at ESPNcricinfo

1854 births
1917 deaths
Cricketers from Sydney
Australian cricketers
English cricketers
Sussex cricketers
English cricketers of 1864 to 1889